Austin Crute (born October 24, 1995) is an American actor and singer best known for his roles in the Netflix series Daybreak and the films Booksmart and They/Them.

Biography
Crute was born into a religious family, the son of a pastor in Norcross, Georgia. In 2011-2012, at age 15, Crute appeared as a contestant on the reality competition Majors & Minors and subsequently, the musical album which arose out of the show. He graduated high school from Greater Atlanta Christian School in 2014. He graduated from New York University in 2018.  He portrayed Alan in the 2019 coming of age film Booksmart, Olivia Wilde's directorial debut and Wesley Fists in the post-apocalyptic Netflix series Daybreak.  He previously had a guest appearance as "Black Justin Bieber" in an episode of the FX series Atlanta.

Crute is openly gay, and played LGBTQ characters in Booksmart, Daybreak, and They/Them''.

As a recording artist Crute has released the track "Ungodly".

Filmography

Film

Television

References

External links
 

1995 births
Living people
American male television actors
American gay actors
American gay musicians
New York University alumni
American hip hop singers
American male film actors
21st-century American male actors
LGBT people from Georgia (U.S. state)
People from Norcross, Georgia
LGBT African Americans
21st-century African-American people
21st-century American LGBT people